György Bálint (originally surname Braun; 28 July 191921 June 2020) was a Hungarian horticulturist, Candidate of Agricultural Sciences, journalist, author, and politician who served as an MP.

Biography
Bálint's parents Braun Izidor and Koch Rozália were Jewish from a long tradition of farming. He graduated from the Royal Hungarian Institute of Horticulture in 1941. His parents and their children were deported to a concentration camp during the Holocaust; only Bálint and one of his sisters survived. He was taken first to Mauthausen and then to the extermination camp in Gunskirchen. He weighed 42 kilos when he escaped in 1945.

He was a horticulturist, Candidate of Agricultural Sciences, journalist, author, and politician who served as an MP.

He died at 100 years of age in 2020 from COVID-19 during the COVID-19 pandemic in Hungary.

References

1919 births
2020 deaths
Hungarian centenarians
Members of the National Assembly of Hungary (1994–1998)
People from Gyöngyös
Jewish Hungarian politicians
Alliance of Free Democrats politicians
Hungarian journalists
Hungarian agronomists
Mauthausen concentration camp survivors
20th-century Hungarian male writers
20th-century journalists
Horticulturists
Deaths from the COVID-19 pandemic in Hungary
Men centenarians